The 12th U-boat Flotilla (German 12. Unterseebootsflottille) was a German U-boat flotilla formed on 15 October 1942 at Bordeaux under the command of Korvettenkapitän Klaus Scholtz. The flotilla was disbanded on 25 August 1944 due to the imminent arrival of Allied forces.

Flotilla commanders

Assigned U-boats
The following U-boats were assigned to 12th U-boat Flotilla at Bordeaux at various times during their service life:

 
 
 
 
 
 
 
 
 
 
 
 
 
 
 
 
 
 
 
 
 
 
 
 
 
 
 
 
 
 
 
 
 
 
 
 
 
 
 
 
 
 

Thirty-nine of the forty-two U-boats assigned to 12th Flotilla were destroyed during their assignment. Before the base at Bordeaux was captured by the Allies, U-861, U-862 and U-1061 managed to escape, and were transferred to other U-boat flotillas.

Assigned ex-Italian submarines
The following Italian submarines were captured after the Italian capitulation in September 1943 and assigned to the 12th U-boat Flotilla:

 UIT-22 (Alpino Bagnolini)
 UIT-23 (Reginaldo Giuliani)
 UIT-24 (Comandante Cappellini)
 UIT-25 (Luigi Torelli)

References 

12
Military units and formations established in 1941
Military units and formations disestablished in 1945